William J. "Billy" Donohue (1854 - April, 1936) was a jockey, trainer and owner of Thoroughbred racehorses who competed in his native Canada as well as the United States where he won each of the three races that would become the U. S. Triple Crown series.

Background
In an October 11, 1886 article on famous jockeys, The Daily Alta California said that "The Donohue family is a great one in American racing affairs, but of the lot William Donohue is the best known."

William Donohue's first Classic win came in the June 10, 1876 Belmont Stakes at Jerome Park Racetrack in Westchester County, New York aboard Algerine. His second success in a Classic occurred on May 23, 1883, when he rode Leonatus to victory in the Kentucky Derby at Churchill Downs in Louisville, Kentucky. Donohue got his third Classic with Dunboyne in the Preakness Stakes run on May 13, 1887, at Pimlico Race Course in Baltimore, Maryland.

Among his other important jockey wins, in 1884 William Donohue rode General Monroe to win the inaugural running of the Suburban Handicap, a race that would soon rank as the most important American race open to older horses.

Jockey, Trainer, Owner
During his career in racing William Donohue also trained horses, notably for the family of Canada's preeminent owner, the Seagram Stable. He also acquired horses for his own account and for a number of years could sometimes be found both riding and training a horse for a client or for himself.

In April 1936, William Donohue died in Toronto, Ontario.

References

1854 births
1936 deaths
Canadian jockeys
Canadian horse trainers
American jockeys
American horse trainers
Canadian racehorse owners and breeders
American racehorse owners and breeders
Sportspeople from Montreal